George Lazenby Reynolds, Jr. (August 18, 1927 – November 3, 1991) was the ninth bishop of the Episcopal Diocese of Tennessee, serving from 1985 to 1991. He was the first bishop to serve the remnant diocese, encompassing the middle third of the state, after the separations of the Diocese of West Tennessee and the Diocese of East Tennessee from the original statewide judicatory, in 1983 and 1985, respectively. He maintained offices in Nashville, as the Tennessee diocese continues to do to this day.

Biography
Reynolds was born in Opelika, Alabama on August 18, 1927. He graduated from the Sewanee: The University of the South. He also graduated from Virginia Theological Seminary with a masters of divinity in 1954. He also acquired a Ph.D. degree from New York University in 1970.

Ordination
Reynolds was ordained deacon on July 1, 1954 in Otey Memorial Parish Church by Theodore N. Barth, Bishop of Tennessee, and a priest a year later. He served as rector of St. Stephen's Church in Edina, Minnesota from 1976 until 1985. Prior to this he served parishes in Pennsylvania and Ohio and was chaplain to Sewanee Military Academy, a preparatory school for boys located near the University of the South. He was employed by the Christian Education department of the Episcopal Church Center for six years.

Bishop
On January 26, 1985, Reynolds was elected Bishop of Tennessee, succeeding William E. Sanders, who opted to assume the episcopate in the new East Tennessee diocese (Sanders had worked there for many years prior). Reynolds was consecrated bishop on June 15, 1985 by Presiding Bishop John Allin in the All Saints Chapel of the University of the South. He died while in office on November 3, 1991.

References

External links 
Tennessee Elects Reynolds Bishop
Episcopal News Service obituary

1927 births
1991 deaths
Episcopal bishops of Tennessee
Virginia Theological Seminary alumni
Sewanee: The University of the South alumni
People from Opelika, Alabama
20th-century American Episcopalians
20th-century American clergy